Tiilikkajärvi National Park is a national park in Finland, located both in Rautavaara, North Savonia and Sotkamo, Kainuu.

Southern and northern natural features mix in this park forming an ecotone of forest and swamp types.

The Tiilikkajärvi lake is a barren  lake with beaches all around it, split in the middle by esker capes.

Fauna
Northern bird species brambling and rustic bunting are common in the park's forests. The most common bird species of the bogs is the yellow wagtail. The Eurasian whimbrel also nests on the bogs. The barren Tiilikkajärvi lake is inhabited by the black-throated diver, and its beaches by the little ringed plover. Other species of the area include the lesser black-backed gull, capercaillie, willow grouse, bean goose, Eurasian golden plover, and the Siberian jay. In the summer of 1993, the pine grosbeak nested in the area. The beaver lives in the nearby rivers.

See also 
 List of national parks of Finland
 Protected areas of Finland

References

External links
 
 Outdoors.fi – Tiilikkajärvi National Park

National parks of Finland
Protected areas established in 1982
Geography of North Savo
Geography of Kainuu
Tourist attractions in North Savo
Tourist attractions in Kainuu
1982 establishments in Finland